Ectoedemia hypericella is a moth of the family Nepticulidae. It was described by Annette Frances Braun in 1925. It is known from North America, including Ohio.

References

External links

Nepticulidae
Moths of North America

Taxa named by Annette Frances Braun
Leaf miners
Moths described in 1925